The Baynes Mountains are a mountain range in Namibia.

Description
The Baynes Mountains form an escarpment plateau in Kunene Region in northwest Namibia, near the border with Angola (formed here by the Kunene River). The Baynes are of quartz sandstone and have steep cliffs and gorges. The Baynes Gorge is where the Kunene River passes the Zebra and Baynes Mountains before entering the Namib Desert.

Flora
Baynes Mountains flora include Abrus kaokoensis, Baynesia lophophora and Euphorbia ohiva.

References

Mountain ranges of Namibia